Farshad is a given name of Iranian origins. Farshad may refer to:

Farshad Ahmadzadeh, Iranian football midfielder
Farshad Alizadeh, Iranian wrestler
Farshad Bahadorani (born 1982), Iranian football midfielder
Farshad Bashir (born 1988), Dutch politician of Afghan descent
Amir Farshad Ebrahimi,(born 1975), former member of Ansar-e Hezbollah
Farshad Falahatzadeh (born 1967), retired Iranian football player and now manager
Farshad Faraji, Iranian football winger
Farshad Mobasher Fard, Iranian citizen expelled from France for alleged link to Iran's nuclear program
Aryana Farshad, Iranian writer, director, and film producer
Farshad Fotouhi, the dean of Wayne State University's college of engineering
Farshad Ghadiri (born 1979), Iranian football goalkeeper
Farshad Ghasemi, Iranian football player
Farshad Janfaza, Iranian football forward
Farshad Khazei (born 1965), Iranian born entrepreneur living in Hungary
Farshad Mohammadi, Iranian footballer and midfielder
Farshad Noor (born 1994), Afghan professional football player
Farshad Pious (born 1962), retired Iranian football player
Farshad Salarvand (born 1988), Iranian football player
Artimes Farshad Yeganeh (born 1981), Iranian rock climber

See also
Farhad
Farsa
Fasad

Iranian masculine given names